Yvonne Vale (née van Bakel) (born 29 August 1970) is an association football goalkeeper who represented New Zealand at international level.

Vale made her Football Ferns début as a substitute in a 0–1 loss to Russia on 28 August 1994, and finished her international career with 13 caps to her credit.

Vale's son Jordan Vale represented New Zealand at the 2011 FIFA U-17 World Cup.

References

External links

1970 births
Living people
New Zealand women's association footballers
New Zealand women's international footballers
Women's association football goalkeepers